The King's Demons is the sixth and final serial of the 20th season of the British science fiction television series Doctor Who, which was originally broadcast on BBC1 on 15 and 16 March 1983. This serial introduced Kamelion, voiced by Gerald Flood, as a companion.

The serial is set in an English castle in 1215. In the serial, the alien time traveller the Master (Anthony Ainley) uses the robot Kamelion to imitate King John of England as part of the Master's plot to have the real King John overthrown and thus prevent the signing of Magna Carta.

Plot
In 1215, the Court of King John of England is at the castle of Sir Ranulf Fitzwilliam to extort more taxes, and when the lord refuses to pay the King insults him. To defend his honour his son Hugh takes on the King's champion, Sir Gilles Estram, in a joust. The latter wins easily, though the joust is disturbed by the arrival of the TARDIS. The Fifth Doctor, Tegan, and Turlough are greeted as demons and welcomed by the King.

Having established the date, the Doctor concludes the King is not himself – in fact, he is not the King at all, as he is actually in London taking the Crusader’s Oath. Sir Geoffrey de Lacy, the cousin of Sir Ranulf, arrives at the castle and confirms he knows the King is in London. Sir Gilles is about to torture him as a liar during a royal banquet when the Doctor intervenes. It seems the King's champion is not who he claims to be, either: Sir Gilles sheds his disguise and reveals himself to be the Doctor's nemesis, the Master. He flees in his own TARDIS, which had been disguised as an iron maiden.

The King knights the Doctor as his new champion, and he is given run of the castle. After a series of mishaps, including the death of Sir Geoffrey at the Master's hands, the Doctor confronts the King and the Master and discovers the truth. The monarch is really Kamelion, a war weapon found by the Master on Xeriphas, which can be mentally controlled and used to adopt disguises and personas. Disguised as King John, the Master intends that Kamelion will behave so appallingly so as to provoke a rebellion and topple the real King from his throne, thus robbing the world of Magna Carta, the foundation of parliamentary democracy. It is a small plan on the Master's usual scale, but nevertheless particularly poisonous to the normal progress of Earth society.

The Doctor resolves the situation by testing the Master in a battle of wills for control over Kamelion. He takes control of the robot and steals it away in the TARDIS, thus foiling the Master's scheme. Kamelion reverts to its robot form and thanks the Doctor for his assistance and rescue. Kamelion asks to stay aboard the TARDIS, though Tegan seems unsure. When the Doctor suggests returning Tegan to Earth, Tegan however says she still wants to stay. The crew then head off for the Eye of Orion.

Production

The story was repeated on BBC1 on consecutive Fridays 6–13 July 1984, achieving viewing figures of 3.3 and 5.0 million respectively.
The working titles for this story were The Android, The Demons, A Knight's Tale and Demons Keeper. Part One of this story was billed by the BBC as the six hundredth episode of Doctor Who.

This story marked the first appearance of Kamelion as voiced by Gerald Flood. Freelance effects designer Richard Gregory and software designer Mike Power gave a demonstration of the robot prototype for Nathan-Turner and Saward. Nathan-Turner was so impressed he commissioned scriptwriter Terence Dudley to develop a storyline to introduce Kamelion into the series. Shortly after filming, however, Power died in a boating accident and no one was able to continue his work. Subsequently, Kamelion made only two appearances before being written out of the series.

In the story, the Master disguises himself as Sir Gilles Estram, Estram being an anagram of "Master". To hide Ainley's return, Sir Gilles was credited in the Radio Times as having been played by "James Stoker", an anagram of "Master's Joke".

This story marks the last appearance of the TARDIS console room set, which had been in use since The Invisible Enemy. A new console room would debut in the next story, The Five Doctors, although the console itself would be reused as the Second Doctor's console in The Two Doctors.

Commercial releases

In print

A novelisation of this serial, written by Terence Dudley, was published by Target Books in February 1986.

Home media
The King's Demons was released on VHS in November 1995 in a box set along with a special edition of the subsequent serial The Five Doctors and a postcard book. It and Planet of Fire were released in a Kamelion-themed DVD box set on 14 June 2010.

References

External links

Target novelisation

Fifth Doctor serials
Doctor Who pseudohistorical serials
Doctor Who serials novelised by Terence Dudley
The Master (Doctor Who) television stories
1983 British television episodes
Television series set in the Middle Ages
Fiction set in the 1210s
Cultural depictions of John, King of England
Television episodes set in England